Heliconia paludigena is a species of plant in the family Heliconiaceae. It is endemic to Ecuador.

References

Flora of Ecuador
paludigena
Vulnerable plants
Taxonomy articles created by Polbot